Yachting Association of Sri Lanka (YASL) is recognised by the International Sailing Federation as the governing body for the sport of sailing in Sri Lanka.

Clubs
 Royal Colombo Yacht Club
 Ceylon Motor Yacht Club
 Dehaweela Sailing Club (closed 1973)
 Sri Lanka Navy Sailing Club
 Bentota Windsurfing Club
 Ruhunu Sailing Association (established 2006)
 Kalpitiya Windsports Club

The Royal Colombo Yacht Club (RCYC) was formerly known as 'Colombo Sailing Club'. In 1898 the club received a royal charter and was renamed to the Royal Colombo Yacht Club. In the 1980s the club had to leave its club house at Colombo Harbour to accommodate the expansion of the port and for security reasons. The club then shared facilities with the Ceylon Motor Yacht Club at Bolgoda Lake, Moratuwa.  In 2005 a new clubhouse was constructed on the beach at Mt. Lavinia, adjacent to the Lifesaving Association's building.

The Ceylon Motor Yacht Club (CMYC) was established in 1929 and has operated from its current location on the shores of Lake Bolgoda since 1936.

Events
 Sailing Nationals
 South Asian Yachting Regatta (formerly Tri-nation Regatta)
 Colombo to Galle Regatta
 Royal Thomian Optimist Sailing Regatta
 2006 Enterprise World Championship 
 2011 GP14 World Championship
 2012 IODA Optimist Asian Championship

The YASL has seen its activity much reduced during the past three decades owing to the civil war in the island. Even so, the YASL manages to organize regattas regularly, like the Janashanthi Sailing Nationals. In July 2004 the Yachting Association of Sri Lanka revived the Tri-nation Regatta, in which yachts from India and Pakistan compete with local yachts. The Sailing Nationals are generally held in January and contested by four different dinghy classes:  Enterprise; GP14; Optimist and Laser, together with windsurfers.

The YASL has a sailing school and a small Optimist fleet.

Notable competitive sailors
 Ray Wijewardene - Silver medalist 1970 Asian Games
 Lalin Jirasinha - Bronze medalist 1998 Asian Games
 Krishan Janaka - Bronze medalist 1998 Asian Games

References

External links
 ISAF MNA Microsite

Sri Lanka
Clubs and societies in Sri Lanka
Sports governing bodies in Sri Lanka